Gowavar Rural District is a rural district (dehestan) in Govar District, Gilan-e Gharb County, Kermanshah Province, Iran. At the 2006 census the population of the district was recorded as 8,699, which was made up of 1,782 families. The rural district has 44 villages.

References 

Rural Districts of Kermanshah Province
Gilan-e Gharb County